This is a list of members of the Tasmanian House of Assembly between the 2 May 1959 election and the 2 May 1964 election. Prior to this election, each of the five Tasmanian seats had been expanded from 6 to 7 members to provide an odd number of members, due mainly to a series of hung parliaments.

Notes
  Liberal MHA for Denison, Sir Archibald Park, died on 18 November 1959. A recount on 4 December 1959 resulted in the election of former Liberal MHA Horace Strutt.
  Liberal MHA for Bass, Fred Marriott, resigned on 30 October 1961 to contest the federal election for the seat of Bass, but was unsuccessful. A recount on 10 November 1961 resulted in the election of Liberal candidate James McGowen.
  Independent MHA for Bass, Reg Turnbull, resigned on 30 October 1961 to contest an Australian Senate seat in the federal election, in which he was successful. A recount on 10 November 1961 resulted in the election of Labor candidate Wallace Fraser.
  Liberal MHA for Bass, John Steer, resigned on 22 November 1961 to contest the Council seat of Cornwall, but was unsuccessful. A recount on 1 December 1961 resulted in the election of Liberal candidate Max Bushby.
  Labor MHA for Franklin, John Dwyer, died on 17 January 1962. At a recount on 5 February 1962, former Labor MHA (now Independent) Brian Crawford was elected, but he was disqualified on the grounds of non-residence. A further recount on 9 March 1962 elected Lynda Heaven, the first Labor woman to be elected to the House.

Sources
 
 Parliament of Tasmania (2006). The Parliament of Tasmania from 1856

Members of Tasmanian parliaments by term
20th-century Australian politicians